Col. William Travers (c. 1630 – 1679) was a lawyer, early settler and politician of Colonial Virginia.

Early life

William Travers was born in England around 1630. His brother Rawleigh Travers emigrated to Virginia by 1653, and had been appointed a justice of the peace for Lancaster County by 1657.

Career in Virginia

The first record of William in the Colony was in 1656 when he was witness to a will. He received 500 acres of land on Morattica Creek from Thomas Chetwood in 1661. By 1665, this Travers acquired land on the south side of the Rappahannock River and in 1668 he acquired 2,650 acres on its north bank. Also, in 1679 he patented 780 acres in Stafford County
As Captain, with Colonel John Washington, John Lee, William Mosely, and Robert Beverley, Travers was appointed to settle the bounds of Northumberland and Westmoreland Counties. In 1675, as Colonel for Rappanhannock County, the Governor's Council appointed him to a commission to employ Indians in defense of the Colony.

William was Speaker of the House of Burgesses in 1676, and limited records cannot confirm that he represented Lancaster County at that session. In February 1677, the general assembly paid him 2,325 pounds of tobacco, though it is unclear whether it was for military service during Bacon's Rebellion or for his services as lawyer and auditor. Thus, one historian who believes him probably aligned with the previous Speaker, Augustine Warner (who could no longer serve in the lower house after his elevation to the Governor's Council), and not attracted to Bacon's Cause.

Personal life

He married Rebecca (Brookes?). Their son Samuel married Frances Allerton the granddaughter of Mayflower passenger Isaac Allerton and great granddaughter of William Brewster.

Death and legacy

Travers died in Lancaster County, Virginia before April 1679. His successor as Speaker, Mathew Kemp, represented Gloucester County, Virginia before his speakership and until his elevation to the Governor's Council.

References

1630 births
1679 deaths
English emigrants
People from Lancaster County, Virginia
Speakers of the Virginia House of Burgesses